The women's triples lawn bowling competition began on 4 October 2010. and finished on 10 October 2010.

Results

Qualifying – round robin

Section A

Section B

Knockout stages

References

Lawn bowls at the 2010 Commonwealth Games
Comm